Cantero is a surname. Notable people with the surname include:

Castor Cantero (1918–?), former football midfielder from Paraguay
Edgar Cantero (born 1981), Spanish writer and cartoonist
Ever Cantero (born 1985), Paraguayan footballer that currently plays for Santiago Morning in Chile
Federico Cantero Villamil (1874–1946), Spanish civil engineer known for the dams he constructed and planned along the river Duero
José Cantero (born 1959), Argentine professional golfer who currently plays on both the TPG Tour and the Tour de las Americas
Juan Pablo Cantero (born 1982), Argentine professional basketball player
Manuel Cantero, aka Manu (born 1973), Spanish footballer who plays for Sporting Villanueva Promesas, as a goalkeeper
Marciano Cantero (born 1960), Argentine singer and musician
Raoul G. Cantero, III (born 1960), Florida lawyer and a former Justice of the Florida Supreme Court
Rodrigo Cantero (born 1985), Paraguayan footballer currently playing for General Caballero of the Primera División in Paraguay
Ronaldo Cantero (dead 2006), Paraguayan chess master
Sergio Alejandro Ortega Cantero (born 1988), Paraguayan football Midfielder, who plays in Chile for Santiago Morning

See also
Canterò, the second album by French singer Amaury Vassili, released on 26 November 2010